Sakura Genesis was a professional wrestling event promoted by New Japan Pro-Wrestling (NJPW). The event took place on April 4, 2021 in Tokyo at Ryōgoku Kokugikan. Previously held under the Invasion Attack name, this was the third event to be held under the Sakura Genesis name.

Six matches were contested at the event. In the main event, Will Ospreay defeated Kota Ibushi to win the IWGP World Heavyweight Championship. In another prominent match, Roppongi 3K (Sho and Yoh) defeated El Desperado and Yoshinobu Kanemaru to win the IWGP Junior Heavyweight Tag Team Championship for the fifth time.

Production

Background 
Since 2020, NJPW has unable to run events with a full arena capacity due to COVID-19 restrictions. On January 22, NJPW announced Sakura Genesis for April 4, 2021, making it the first time the event will held since 2018 due to the G1 Supercard taking place instead in 2019 and the 2020 event being cancelled due the COVID-19 pandemic.

Storylines 
Sakura Genesis will feature professional wrestling matches that involve different wrestlers from pre-existing scripted feuds and storylines. Wrestlers portray villains, heroes, or less distinguishable characters in the scripted events that build tension and culminate in a wrestling match or series of matches.

On March 1, NJPW announced that the IWGP Heavyweight and IWGP Intercontinental Championships would be unified to create the new IWGP World Heavyweight Championship with the inaugural champion being decided at 49th Anniversary Show, following the IWGP Heavyweight and IWGP Intercontinental Champion Kota Ibushi defending the titles for the final time against El Desperado in the main event. At the anniversary event Ibushi defeated El Desperado to become the inaugural champion. Ibushi will make his first title defense of the IWGP World Heavyweight Championship at Sakura Genesis against the New Japan Cup winner. On March 21, Will Ospreay defeated Shingo Takagi in the New Japan Cup final to face Ibushi at Sakura Genesis.

Results

See also
 2021 in professional wrestling
 List of major NJPW events

References

External links 
 Official New Japan Pro-Wrestling's website

2021 in professional wrestling
2021 in Tokyo
2021